Samuel Rose (August 11, 1911 – January 31, 1960) was a Democratic lawyer and politician from Philadelphia.

Rose was born in 1911 in Philadelphia, the son of Issac Louis Rose and Minnie Mutterpearl Rose. Raised in West Philadelphia, he attended Overbrook High School before graduating from the University of Pennsylvania and Temple University Law School. In 1940, he married Rosalie Abrams, with whom he had two children. After law school, he worked as an assistant examiner at the Pennsylvania Public Utility Commission before starting a private law practice with an office in the Market Street Bank Building in Center City Philadelphia. He also worked as a part-time boxing promoter.

Rose quickly got involved in local politics as a Democrat, becoming leader of the 24th ward. He was elected to the Pennsylvania House of Representatives as one of three members from the 18th district, along with fellow Democrats Marshall L. Shepard and John J. Finnerty. (House members at that time were chosen from multimember districts.) In 1942, despite Republican gains statewide, Rose and Finnerty were reelected along with Democrat Dennis W. Hoggard. Two years later, the voters elected all three representatives to another term. In 1946, the Republicans swept the city and much of the state including Rose's district as he and his co-members went down to defeat. Two years later the Democrats regained some of their losses, including electing Rose, Hoggard, and Edward J. Conway from the 18th district, but Republicans still controlled the House. All three were reelected in 1950, despite Republican gains elsewhere in the state.

In 1951, Rose was elected to Philadelphia City Council from West Philadelphia's 4th district, part of a Democratic wave that swept the Republicans from power for the first time in 67 years. He was appointed head of the Law and Government Committee. In 1954, he joined with other reformers to successfully oppose the efforts fellow Democrats James Hugh Joseph Tate and Michael J. Towey to weaken the civil service reforms of the new charter. The following year, he was reelected with an increased majority of 68%. After his reelection, he was elected majority leader. Rose changed course and joined with Tate in proposing similar amendments to the charter in 1956. The proposals made it on to the April ballot but were defeated by the voters.

Rose suffered a heart attack in April 1959, but recovered enough to win reelection that year. His ailment persisted, however, and he died on January 31, 1960, at the age of 48. Rose was buried at Roosevelt Memorial Park in Trevose, Pennsylvania.

References

Sources

1911 births
1960 deaths
Jewish American people in Pennsylvania politics
Philadelphia City Council members
Pennsylvania Democrats
Pennsylvania lawyers
20th-century American lawyers
20th-century American politicians
Temple University Beasley School of Law alumni
20th-century American Jews